The Sprout Fund is a non-profit organization dedicated to funding various programs designed to increase civic engagement in Pittsburgh, Pennsylvania.

Sprout-funded murals were named the "Best Public Art" by the Pittsburgh City Paper in 2006.

The Sprout Fund hosts an annual fundraiser called "Hothouse", a "roving party". Most of that money funds the "Sprout Seed Awards", a series to small to moderate grants.

Projects funded 
 The New Yinzer
The Original Magazine''''
 Weave Magazine''
 Handmade Arcade 
 Conflict Kitchen

See also
 Mural Arts Program, Philadelphia mural program

References

Non-profit organizations based in Pittsburgh
Culture of Pittsburgh
2001 establishments in Pennsylvania
Organizations established in 2001